Toquerville is a city in east–central Washington County, Utah, United States. The population was 1,370 at the 2010 census.

Geography
Ash Creek flows through the community. Utah State Route 17 passes through the community and connects with Interstate 15 2.5 miles north of the community.

Demographics

As of the census of 2000, there were 910 people, 282 households, and 236 families residing in the town. The population density was 64.3 people per square mile (24.8/km2). There were 325 housing units at an average density of 23.0 per square mile (8.9/km2). On July 12, 2007, the City Council approved the development of 3000 households. The racial makeup of the town was 97.03% White, 0.11% African American, 0.88% Native American, 0.11% Asian, 0.11% Pacific Islander, 0.77% from other races, and 0.99% from two or more races. Hispanic or Latino of any race were 2.86% of the population.

There were 282 households, out of which 36.9% had children under the age of 18 living with them, 72.0% were married couples living together, 9.6% had a female householder with no husband present, and 16.3% were non-families. 14.2% of all households were made up of individuals, and 4.6% had someone living alone who was 65 years of age or older. The average household size was 3.23 and the average family size was 3.56.

In the town the population was spread out, with 32.9% under the age of 18, 9.3% from 18 to 24, 19.6% from 25 to 44, 24.6% from 45 to 64, and 13.6% who were 65 years of age or older. The median age was 34 years. For every 100 females, there were 101.8 males. For every 100 females age 18 and over, there were 97.1 males.

The median income for a household in the town was $34,038, and the median income for a family was $36,146. Males had a median income of $26,964 versus $20,938 for females. The per capita income for the town was $12,713. About 10.7% of families and 14.6% of the population were below the poverty line, including 17.1% of those under age 18 and 2.5% of those age 65 or over.

History

Toquerville was named after an early Paiute chief. The population has grown from only 19 families in the late 1800s. Toquerville's proximity to Zion National Park has created a healthy tourism economy where the community traditionally had depended on agriculture.

Although it was still a town at the 2000 census, Toquerville became a city at the end of 2000.

See also

 List of municipalities in Utah

References

External links

 

Cities in Washington County, Utah
Cities in Utah
Populated places established in 1858
1858 establishments in Utah Territory